Mohamed Fadl Al-Moula El-Sir Abdalla (born 1949) or simply Mohamed El-Sir Abdalla, nicknamed Kaunda, is a Sudanese former footballer. He competed in the 1972 Summer Olympics with the Sudan national team.

References

External links
 
 

1949 births
Living people
Sudanese footballers
Al-Merrikh SC players
Association football defenders
Sudan international footballers
Olympic footballers of Sudan
Footballers at the 1972 Summer Olympics
1970 African Cup of Nations players
1972 African Cup of Nations players
Africa Cup of Nations-winning players
Place of birth missing (living people)